Stiles French (December 6, 1801 – May 9, 1881) was an American teacher and founder of the New Haven Collegiate and Commercial Institute, later known as the Russell Military Academy.

French the third child of David and Anna (Johnson) French, was born in Bethany, a parish of Woodbridge, Conn., December 6, 1801. He began to teach a district school at the age of 17, and it was not until the spring of 1823 that he was able to make systematic preparation for College. He was admitted to the Sophomore Class of Yale College at the end of the first term and graduated in 1827. After graduation, he pursued advanced scientific studies under the direction of the college for two or three years, being also connected from the Spring of 1828 with the New Haven Gymnasium, as mathematical teacher. He taught in New Haven until the spring of 1831, when he accepted the position of teacher of Mathematics in the Round Hill School, at Northampton, Mass., where he remained for two years. In August, 1833, he established, with his brother, a Collegiate and Commercial School in Wooster Square, in New Haven, which he conducted for about twelve years. After an interval of leisure he established another classical and scientific school in this city, which he maintained for over twenty-five years. About the year 1875 he removed to Northampton, but in 1880 returned to New Haven, where he died May 9, 1881, of a disease of the kidneys, after five months' illness.

He was twice married, and by his second marriage had a son and a daughter. His son was drowned in 1869, while a member of the Sophomore Class of Yale. His wife and daughter survived him.

External links

1801 births
1881 deaths
People from Bethany, Connecticut
Yale College alumni
Schoolteachers from Connecticut
19th-century American educators